Hypatima vinculata is a moth in the family Gelechiidae. It was described by Pathania and Rose in 2003. It is found in India.

References

Hypatima
Moths described in 2003